Monaco competed at the 2006 Winter Olympics in Turin, Italy.
For the first time since 1984, the team did not include Prince Albert of Monaco, who became the ruler of the Principality following the death of his father Rainier III.

Alpine skiing 

Note: In the men's combined, run 1 is the downhill, and runs 2 and 3 are the slalom. In the women's combined, run 1 and 2 are the slalom, and run 3 the downhill.

Bobsleigh 

Despite the absence of Prince Albert, a bobsleigh team from Monaco competed.

References

 

Nations at the 2006 Winter Olympics
2006 Winter Olympics
Winter Olympics